As of 2021, this is the list of current, former series broadcast by the Bhojpuri entertainment channel Zee Ganga.

Current broadcast

Former shows

Original series

Acquired series
Banoo Main Teri Dulhann
Kasamh Se
Bahuriya No. 1
Qubool Hai
Kumkum Bhagya
Tashan-e-Ishq
Maayka
Zindagi Ki Mehek
Kaala Teeka
Sarojini – Ek Nayi Pehal
Kehu Aapan Ba
Piyaa Albela
Doo Duni Ke Paanch
Gangaa
B. D. O. Bitiya
Sasural Wali Mai
Begusarai (TV series)
Litti Chokha (TV series)
Vikram Aur Muncha
Har Mushkil Ka Hal Akbar Birbal
Police Files
Sajanwa Piyari Ke Rakhiha Laaj
Agle Janam Mohe Bitiya Hi Kijo
Jeet Gayi Toh Piya Morey (TV series)
Satrangi Sasural
Doli Armaano Ki
Jogira Sa Ra Ra
Tenali Rama (TV series)

Music programming
Big Top 20
Chhapra Express (TV series)
Bhojpuriya Beats

Horror/supernatural series
Brahmarakshas
Trikaali – Abhishaap Ya Vardhaan
Naag Kanyaka
Daayan
Trikaali – Abhishaap Ya Vardhaan Season 2

Mythological series
Devon Ke Dev...Mahadev
Chakradhari Ajay Krishna
Baal Krishna
Santoshi Maa
Mahadevi (TV series)
Sankat Mochan Jai Hanuman
Divya Shakti
Jai Durga Maiya
Nimiya Ke Darr Maiya
Maa Shakti
Hum Hai Bajrangi
Grah Nakshatr Aur Aap
Bhagawat (TV series)
Vishwas Ke Ooper Aastha
Prabhu Se Preet Lagai
Jai Bolenath
Shaktipeeth Ke Bhairav
Mast Malang Bole Baba Ke Bam
Bhakti Samrat
Jai Sri Krishna
Yantra Express
Bhakti Sagar
Ram Charan Sukh Dayi

Reality/non-scripted programming
Big Bahuriya
Big Memsaab No. 1
Big Memsaab Season 3
Big Memsaab Season 4
Big Memsaab Season 5
Big Memsaab Season 6
Big Memsaab Season 7
Big Memsaab Season 8
Sa Re Ga Ma Pa Bhojpuri
Mureta Maidaan
Sa Re Ga Ma Pa Rang Purvaiya
Sa Re Ga Ma Pa Li'l Champs Bhojpuri
Hindustan Ka Big Star
Roj Hoi Khoj
Roj Hoi Khoj Season 3
Roj Hoi Khoj Season 4
Entertainment Ke Mela
Rasoi Ki Rani Season 4
Chef VS Fridge
Birha Muqabla
Loksamrat Birha Ke Bahubali
Raag Chunavi

Comedy series
Bagal Wali Jaan Mareli

Anthology series
Ganga Gaurav

References

Zee Ganga